SA Army Troop Information Unit  was a South African Army Intelligence Corps COMOPS unit, utilizing conscripts who had completed university or worked in a professional capacity as cameramen, freelance journalists, photographers, public relations officers and journalists from practically every newspaper in South Africa. 
The unit drew upon these specialist skills and professions, providing staff to the State run broadcasting service, the South African Broadcasting Corporation. The personnel undertook their two year military service within this non-military institution as a media centre where a paper war was being played out.

Notes

References 

South African Army
Disbanded military units and formations in Johannesburg